MEB Şura Salonu also known as Festival Hall is a concert hall in Ankara. It is noted for its tango performances.

External links
MEB Şura Hall (ankaratango.com)

Entertainment venues in Ankara
Concert halls in Ankara